Ctenoscelis is a genus of beetles in the family Cerambycidae, containing the following species:

 Ctenoscelis acanthopus (Germar, 1824)
 Ctenoscelis ater (Olivier, 1795)
 Ctenoscelis coeus (Perty, 1832)
 Ctenoscelis simplicicollis (Bates, 1875)

References

Prioninae